Séamus Fitzgerald (21 August 1896 – 23 July 1972) was an Irish politician. He was elected unopposed as a Sinn Féin Teachta Dála (TD) to the 2nd Dáil at the 1921 elections for the Cork East and North East constituency.

Fitzgerald was born in Cobh (then known as Queenstown) in 1896. He joined the Irish Volunteers in 1914 and was mobilised in Cork in preparation for the Easter Rising in 1916. When the Rising failed to spread beyond Dublin and some other limited actions, Fitzgerald and many of his Cork comrades was interned in Britain. After the amnesty for prisoners he rejoined what had now become the Irish Republican Army (IRA) in Cobh and also became active in the Sinn Féin party. He was elected a member of the town's first republican Urban District Council (later Cobh Town Council) at the 1919 local elections and was elected chairman at its first meeting.

He opposed the Anglo-Irish Treaty and voted against it. He stood as an anti-Treaty Sinn Féin candidate at the 1922 general election but was not elected. He joined Fianna Fáil in 1926 shortly after its foundation and was to remain a prominent member of the party in the Cork area for the next 50 years until his death. He was elected to the Irish Free State Seanad in 1934 and served until it was abolished in 1936. He stood in several elections for that party in both Cork East and Cork City but was only successful on one occasion when elected to the short-lived 11th Dáil as a Fianna Fáil Teachta Dála (TD) for the Cork Borough constituency at the 1943 general election. He lost his seat at the 1944 general election.

He married Mary Harrington in 1927, and they had three children. Fitzgerald owned a local  business in Cobh and was an active member of the local Chamber of Commerce as well as Cork Harbour Commissioners (now the Port of Cork Company). He held several directorships in local companies. Fitzgerald died in 1972.

References

1896 births
1972 deaths
Early Sinn Féin TDs
Fianna Fáil TDs
Fianna Fáil senators
Members of the 2nd Dáil
Members of the 11th Dáil
Members of the 1934 Seanad
Politicians from County Cork
People from Cobh
Irish Republican Army (1919–1922) members